Tomato is a family of community-developed, custom firmware for consumer-grade computer networking routers and gateways powered by Broadcom chipsets. The firmware has been continually forked and modded by multiple individuals and organizations, with the most up-to-date fork provided by the FreshTomato project.

History
Tomato was originally released by Jonathan Zarate in 2006, using the Linux kernel and drawing extensively on the code of HyperWRT. It was targeted at many popular routers of the time, most notably the older Linksys WRT54G series, Buffalo AirStation, Asus routers and Netgear WNR3500L. His final release of the original Tomato firmware came in June 2010, by which point its popularity had grown large enough that development and support continued through the user community, resulting in a series of releases (dubbed "mods") by individual users or teams of them that continues to the present day.

Fedor Kozhevnikov created a notable early mod he called TomatoUSB, which ceased development in November 2010. It was then forked by other developers and remains the nearest common ancestor to all of the forks with any recent activity. The project saw a boost in recognition when Tomato was chosen by Asus as the base used to build the firmware currently preinstalled on their entire line of home routers, ASUSWRT.

Currently, FreshTomato appears to be the only project that has seen active development and new releases.

Features
Several notable features have been part of Tomato long enough to be common to all forks, among them are:
 The graphical user interface (accessed via web browser), including:
 Access to almost the entirety of the features provided by the hardware (manufacturers typically omit many of these from their firmware to prevent misuse and reduce support costs)
 Extensive use of Ajax to display only the settings that are germane to the device's current setup, reducing confusion and keeping related options near each other using fewer pages/tabs
 A CSS-based custom interface theming
 SVG-based graphical bandwidth monitoring, showing total network inbound/outbound activity and that of each connected device through pie charts and line graphs that update in real-time 
 A personal web server (Nginx) that uses the device's "always on, always connected" design to allow users to host their own websites from home for free
 Access and bandwidth restriction configurable for each device or the network as a whole, providing control over the speed and amount of traffic available at any time to any device
 Unrestricted access to the internal system logs and the ability to store them for easier troubleshooting and security audits
 CLI access (BusyBox) via the web-based interface, as well as via Telnet or SSH (using Dropbear)
 Wake-on-LAN
 Advanced QoS: 10 unique QoS classes defined, real-time graphs display prioritized traffic with traffic class details
 Client bandwidth control via QoS classes
 The Dnsmasq software built-in, which provides:
 DHCP server (with static allocation of IP addresses)
 Local DNS server (usually forwarding requests to the DNS provider of choice)
 Wireless modes:
 Access point (AP)
 Wireless client station (STA)
 Wireless Ethernet (WET) bridge
 Wireless distribution system (WDS also known as wireless bridging)
 Simultaneous AP and WDS (also known as wireless repeating)
 Dynamic DNS service with ezUpdate and services extended for more providers
 SES button control
 JFFS2
 SMB client
 Wireless LAN Adjustment of radio transmit power, antenna selection, and 14 wireless channels
 'Boot wait' protection (increase the time slot for uploading firmware via the boot loader)
 Advanced port forwarding, redirection, and triggering with UPnP and NAT-PMP
 Init, shutdown, firewall, and WAN Up scripts
 Uptime, load average, and free memory status
 Minimal reboots - Very few configuration changes require a reboot
 Wireless survey page to view other networks in your neighborhood
 More comprehensive dashboard than stock firmware: displays signal strengths of wireless client devices, reveals UPnP mappings
 Configuration persistence during a firmware upgrade

Feature comparison

Feature comparison (cont.)

See also

 List of wireless router firmware projects

References

External links

 
 FreshTomato MIPS/ARM
 FreshTomato Hardware (Router) Compatibility
 Virtual Tomato RAF (Victek mod)
 Tomato Phoenix (Mod supports MTK chips, such as mt7620 mt7621 mt7628 mt7688)
 Tomato by Shibby
 AdvancedTomato V2
 TomatoAnon (Up-to-date statistics of active Tomato devices by fork/version)

Custom firmware
Free system software
Gateway/routing/firewall distribution
Routing software